Advances in Colloid and Interface Science is a quarterly peer-reviewed scientific journal published by Elsevier. It covers all aspects of colloid and interface science, including surface chemistry, physical chemistry, and surface tension.

Abstracting and indexing
The journal is abstracted and indexed in Applied Polymers Literature, Chemical Abstracts Service, Current Contents/Physics, Chemical, & Earth Sciences, PASCAL, and Scopus. According to the Journal Citation Reports, the journal has a 2020 impact factor of 12.984.

See also
Journal of Colloid and Interface Science
Current Opinion in Colloid & Interface Science

References

External links

Chemistry journals
Quarterly journals
Publications established in 1967
English-language journals
Elsevier academic journals